Publia Licinia Julia Cornelia Salonina (died 268, Mediolanum) was an Augusta of the Roman Empire, married to Roman Emperor Gallienus and mother of Valerian II, Saloninus, and Marinianus.

Life

Salonina's origin is unknown. One modern theory is that she was born of Greek origin in Bithynia, then part of the province of Bithynia et Pontus, Asia Minor. However, there exists some scepticism on that. There has been speculation that she was related to a senator named Publius Cornelius Saecularis of Salona. She may also have been related to her father-in-laws second wife Cornelia Gallonia.

She married Gallienus about ten years before his accession to the throne. When her husband became joint-emperor with his father Valerian in 253, Salonina was named Augusta.

Salonina was the mother of three princes, Valerian II, Saloninus and Marinianus. Her fate after Gallienus was murdered during the siege of Mediolanum in 268 is unknown. One theory is that her life was spared; another is that she was executed together with other members of her family, at the orders of the Senate of Rome.

Her name is reported on coins with Latin legend as Cornelia Salonina; however, from the Greek coinage come the names Iulia Cornelia Salonina, Publia Licinia Cornelia Salonina, and Salonina Chrysogona (attribute that means "begotten of gold"). The names "Publia Licinia" were probably added to her name to mirror her husband whose two first names were "Publius Licinius".

References

Bibliography
 Bray, John. Gallienus : A Study in Reformist and Sexual Politics, Wakefield Press, Kent Town, 1997, 
 "Salonina", Dictionary of Greek and Roman Antiquities, edited William Smith (1870).
 Partial Salonina coinage
 "Dictionary of Roman Coins", by Seth William Stevenson (1889).

Further reading
 Minaud, Gérard, Les vies de 12 femmes d’empereur romain - Devoirs, Intrigues & Voluptés , Paris, L’Harmattan, 2012, ch. 11,  La vie de Cornélia Salonina, femme de Gallien, p. 263-284.

External links

3rd-century Roman empresses
3rd-century Greek women
Year of birth unknown
Crisis of the Third Century
Salonina, Julia
Augustae
Valerian dynasty